Kadhal Endral Enna is a 2008 Indian Tamil language romantic thriller film directed by Kalimuthu. The film stars Vinod Veera, Diya and Charan Raj, with Neeraj, Mayilsamy, Singamuthu, Manikka Vinayagam, Vasu Vikram, Kalimuthu, Shobana, Lavanya, Barathi and Uma playing supporting roles. The film, produced by M. Rajan, was released on 16 May 2008.

Plot
Vishwa (Vinod Veera), a carefree youngster, falls in love at first sight with his neighbour Kamala (Diya) who lives with the police officer Adhisaya Raj (Charan Raj) while Vignesh protects their house. Vishwa then secretly sneaks into her house and he starts to woo her when she is alone at home. One day, Vishwa approaches Kamala and asks her approval, she refuses to accept his love and Kamala tells him that she is already married to Adhisaya Raj.

In the past, Kamala was a bharatanatyam dancer who lived her widower father (Manikka Vinayagam) and she was constantly stalked by young men. Sick of the situation, one day, she complained to the police and the police inspector Adhisaya Raj took severe action against the stalkers. Adhisaya Raj who felt under her spell of Kamala compelled her to marry him but she refused. Adhisaya Raj became very aggressive and possessive towards her. One day, Adhisaya Raj forcefully took her with him and forced her to live with him in his house. Every day, he tortured her to marry him and he sequestered her father in a godown.

Upon hearing the truth, Vishwa decides to free her from the virtual prison. Kamala asks him to kill Adhisaya Raj and to find her father. When Vishwa finally sees Adhisaya Raj's photo, Vishwa refuses to kill him and tells her that Adhisaya Raj has saved his life after a bike accident one day. Thereafter, Adhisaya Raj finds about Kamala and Vishwa's love and he puts the innocent Vishwa behind the police lockup. Later, Vishwa gets released from jail and he frees Kamala from his house. Vishwa and Kamala blackmail Adhisaya Raj by phone: Vishwa agreed to set her free if Kamala's father will sign a document paper. Vishwa with his lover Kamala and Adhisaya Raj with Kamala's father meet up in a remote place for the exchange. Adhisaya Raj cheats them and his henchmen surrounded Vishwa. They beat up Vishwa, put him in a coffin and bury him alive. An angry Vishwa came back to the house and beats Adhisaya Raj up. During the fight, Vignesh who was Vishwa's college enemy shoots Adhisaya Raj dead to save Vishwa. The film ends as Vishwa and Kamala embrace.

Cast

Vinod Veera as Vishwa
Diya as Kamala
Charan Raj as Adhisaya Raj
Neeraj as Vignesh
Mayilsamy
Singamuthu as Nattamai
Manikka Vinayagam as Kamala's father
Vasu Vikram
Kalimuthu
Shobana
Lavanya as Jaanu
Barathi as Vishwa's mother
Uma as Vishwa's sister
Sathya
Krishna
Thangaraj
Sivanarayanamoorthy as Bike owner
Bonda Mani
A. C. Murali Mohan as Vishwa's father
Sampath Kumar
Parthiban
Laksha in a special appearance
Risha in a special appearance

Soundtrack

The film score and the soundtrack were composed by K. Bharathi. The soundtrack features 5 tracks.

Reception
Behindwoods.com rated the film 0.5 out of 5 stars and wrote, "If the storyline is not good enough to tire you, director Kalimuthu has made sure that there are other aspects to do the job. Like the unreasonable and illogical villainy of a cop (Saranraj), the cliché-ridden love story between Diya and Veera, and the sleazy camera angels that capture Diya's fleshy buxomness". A reviewer said, "Our simple request to Director Kalimuthu is that you made a great attempt, but lost the track with perplexity between emotional quotient and glamour".

References

2008 films
2000s romantic thriller films
2000s Tamil-language films
Indian romantic thriller films